Peretz ben Isaac Cohen Gerondi was a 13th-century Iberian kabbalist and rabbi. The surname "Gerondi" is due to a deduction by Adolf Jellinek, and is used for the purpose of describing more in detail the author of Ma'areket ha-Elahut. A certain Peretz, who lived toward the end of the thirteenth century, is mentioned as the author of this kabbalistic work. Some works of Peretz of Corbeil have been erroneously attributed to Gerondi.

References
 

Year of death unknown
Year of birth unknown
13th-century rabbis
13th-century Sephardi Jews